The Belarusian Evangelical Reformed Church was officially registered in 1996 in Minsk. Reformed presence in the country dates back to the 16th century. The first Reformed church was founded in Brest-Litovsk in 1553. At the end of the 16th century more than 200 Reformed congregations were in the territory of Belarus. In 1917 a Reformed high school was opened, till the Communist regime a theological school functioned in Koidanava near Minsk. During the Communist role church activities were suppressed, and church buildings blown up. The community started in 1992 to revive the Reformed presence.

The Apostle Creed, Athanasian Creed and Heidelberg Catechism are the Standards.
It is a member of the Communion of Reformed Evangelical Churches.

External links 
 Official website

References 

Protestantism in Belarus
Reformed denominations in Europe
Presbyterian denominations in Europe
1996 establishments in Belarus
Christian organizations established in 1996
Calvinist denominations established in the 20th century